The Free India Society was a youth organization of Indian students in England, committed to obtaining the independence of India from British rule. Initially an intellectual group, it became a revolutionary outfit under its founding leader, Bhikaji Cama. This organization also released a paper called Free India Society to propagate revolutionary ideas.   

Revolutionary movement for Indian independence
India House